An anti-ballistic weapon is any weapon (be it a missile, a laser, or another type of object) designed to counter threats which are ballistic objects.

"Ballistic objects" include:
Artillery rockets
Artillery shells
Ballistic missiles
Mortar bombs
Rocket-propelled mortar bombs

See also
Anti-ballistic missile

External links